HMS Isis was a 50-gun Portland-class fourth-rate of the Royal Navy. She saw service during the American War of Independence, and the French Revolutionary and Napoleonic Wars.

She was built in 1774 on the River Medway and commissioned under Captain Charles Douglas in 1776, at which time he sailed with a squadron for the relief of Quebec.

She was involved in the Nore mutiny and fought at the Battle of Cuddalore (1783) and Battle of Camperdown (1797). The ship was also engaged at the action of 22 August 1795 off Norway against a Dutch squadron. She then served as the flagship of Vice-Admiral Sir Andrew Mitchell during the 1799 Anglo-Russian invasion of Holland. One of her early midshipmen was Robert Faulknor the younger. She fought in the Battle of Copenhagen in 1801 under Captain James Walker and was badly damaged by a hurricane during the Peace of Amiens on crossing the Atlantic to be Vice Admiral Gambier's flagship in Newfoundland, before going on to further service in Newfoundland, the Caribbean and the North Sea. She was broken up in September 1810.

External links
 
Ships of the Old Navy

Frigates of the Royal Navy
Ships built on the River Medway
Age of Sail frigates of the United Kingdom
1774 ships